Chumburung (Kyongborong, Nchimburu, Nchummuru) is a Guang language spoken by 69,000 persons, mostly Chumburu by tribe and living in the Kingdom of Chumburung at both sides of the southwestern leg of Lake Volta in Ghana.

3,000 of these speak the Yeji (Yedji) dialect, which is quite divergent: no closer to Chumburung proper than Kplang or Krache are.

References

External links
Field research on the Chumburung language at SIL International
Songs in Chumburung
New Testament in Chumburung
Publications describing the language
http://www.northernghanapeoples.co.uk/

Guang languages
Languages of Ghana